Edward Ellice was launched in New Brunswick in 1813 and sailed to England where she was re-registered. She was sold in 1822 in South America.

Career
Edward Ellice was re-registered at London on 28 May 1813. She first appeared in Lloyd's Register (LR) in 1813 with J.Lenox, master, G.Inglis & Co., owners, and trade Liverpool–Quebec.

They were then caught up in the conflict between Spain and the local independence movement in South America. The Chilean squadron had detained Edward Ellice and Lord Suffield at Callao; the Spanish authorities had seized Grant.

A report in The Times stated that Lord Cochrane's squadron  had captured and taken Edward Ellice and Lord Suffield into Huaco on 9 December 1820. The alleged cause of the capture was that the vessels had Spanish property aboard. The crews of the vessels joined Cochrane's squadron and the vessels were to be taken to Valparaiso for adjudication. 

Edward Ellice, Lord Suffield, and Indian, which Cochrane's squadron had detained, arrived at Valparaiso for adjudication on 1 March 1821. A later report was that the Prize Court at Valparaiso had condemned Indian and her cargo. Edward Ellice and Lord Suffield had not yet been adjudicated. An advice dated 8 August at Santiago de Chili reported that Edward Ellice and Lord Suffield had been restored, with their cargoes. On 15 September she sailed for the coast of Peru.

Fate
Edward Ellice became Independencia del Sud. With Heath, master, she arrived at Callao from Guayaquil on 8 April 1822.

Notes

Citations

1813 ships
Age of Sail merchant ships of England
Captured ships